The 2017 American Athletic Conference men's basketball tournament was the conference tournament for the American Athletic Conference during the 2016-17 NCAA Division I men's basketball season. It was held March 9–12, 2017, at the XL Center in Hartford, Connecticut. Originally, the Amway Center in Orlando, Florida (host of the 2016 Tournament) was slated to host the tournament for a second consecutive year, but in November 2014, the NCAA awarded the Amway Center with first and second-round games for the 2017 NCAA Division I men's basketball tournament  As a result, the XL Center hosted the tournament in 2017, with the tournament returning to Orlando in 2018.

Seeds
Teams are seeded by conference record, with ties broken by record between the tied teams followed by record against the regular-season champion, if necessary.

Schedule

Bracket

References

American Athletic Conference men's basketball tournament
2016–17 American Athletic Conference men's basketball season
Basketball competitions in Hartford, Connecticut
College basketball tournaments in Connecticut
2017 in sports in Connecticut